Tin fluoride can refer to:
Tin(II) fluoride (stannous fluoride), SnF2
Tin(IV) fluoride (stannic fluoride), SnF4